Farhat Horchani is a Tunisian politician. He served as Minister of Defence in the cabinet of Prime Minister Youssef Chahed.

References 

Living people
Year of birth missing (living people)
Place of birth missing (living people)
21st-century Tunisian politicians
Justice ministers of Tunisia
Defence ministers of Tunisia